The Old Bayfield County Courthouse is located in Bayfield, Wisconsin.

History
The courthouse was used for its original purpose until 1892, when the county seat of Bayfield County, Wisconsin was moved to Washburn, Wisconsin. Afterwards, the building was used as a school, a World War II prisoner-of-war camp, a community center and a warehouse.

Eventually, the building was taken over by the Bayfield Heritage Association and the Bayfield Historical Society. In 1974, it was added to the National Register of Historic Places and it was later added to the State Register of Historic Places in 1989. In 1976, the National Park Service began leasing the building and it has since become the headquarters of the Apostle Islands National Lakeshore.

References

Courthouses on the National Register of Historic Places in Wisconsin
School buildings on the National Register of Historic Places in Wisconsin
National Register of Historic Places in Bayfield County, Wisconsin
Schools in Bayfield County, Wisconsin
Apostle Islands National Lakeshore
World War II prisoner of war camps in the United States
Neoclassical architecture in Wisconsin
Romanesque Revival architecture in Wisconsin
Government buildings completed in 1884
1884 establishments in Wisconsin